is a 1993 Japanese film directed by Teruo Ishii.

Cast
 Kaoru Mizuki

Reception
It was chosen as the 6th Best Film at the 15th Yokohama Film Festival. Kaoru Mizuki also won the Award for Best Supporting Actress.

References

External links
 

Live-action films based on manga
Films directed by Teruo Ishii
1990s Japanese films